Casa Cautiño is a house museum  in  Guayama, Puerto Rico. The museum collection, administered by the Institute of Puerto Rican Culture, include works of art, wood carvings, sculptures and furniture built by Puerto Rican cabinetmakers for the Cautiño family. It's listed on the National Register of Historic Places.

History
The house was owned by Genaro Cautiño Vázquez, a wealthy Guayama landowner as well as a colonel of the Volunteer Battalion of the Spanish Army. During the Spanish–American War, the house was the headquarters for the American forces. After the war, Genaro Cautiño returned to occupy the house. An additional Annex house, for extended family, also once existed next to the Iglesia San Antonio. Also a tunnel still exists liking Casa Cautiño, the annex house and Iglesia San Antonio.

The U-shaped structure is one-story with an interior patio, which local architect Manual Texidor built in 1887 after graduation from the Academy of Fine Arts in Paris.

It features some of the elements of the Neoclassical architecture style, such as cornices, pilasters, candelabra, Roman arches, relief motifs, and classical ornamentation. These elements were blended with some of the details of the popular architecture of the southern area of Puerto Rico that prevailed when the structure was built.

See also
National Register of Historic Places listings in Guayama, Puerto Rico
List of museums in Puerto Rico

References

External links

Article about Casa Cautiño
Museo Casa Cautiño video tour

Historic house museums in Puerto Rico
Cautiño
Neoclassical architecture in Puerto Rico
National Register of Historic Places in Guayama, Puerto Rico
Houses completed in 1887
1887 establishments in Puerto Rico
Museums in Puerto Rico
Furniture museums